West Bountiful is a city in Davis County, Utah, United States. It is part of the Ogden–Clearfield, Utah Metropolitan Statistical Area. The population was 5,265 at the 2010 census, with an estimated population of 5,731 in 2018.

History

West Bountiful was founded in 1848 by James Fackrell, Sr., a Mormon pioneer. Born in North Petherton, Somersetshire, England, in 1787, Fackrell immigrated to the United States, and after crossing the plains in 1848 with his family, settled in West Bountiful with his wife Amy Crumb.

West Bountiful was incorporated as a town on January 28, 1949, and became a third-class city on November 12, 1962.

Geography
West Bountiful is located in southeastern Davis County and is bordered by Centerville to the north, Bountiful to the east,  
Woods Cross to the south, and Legacy Nature Preserve to the west.
Interstate 15 passes through the eastern part of the city, with access from Exits 316 and 317.

Education
West Bountiful is located in the Davis School District and has one school - West Bountiful Elementary. Students in the city attend Bountiful Junior High and Viewmont High School in Bountiful.

Demographics

As of the census of 2000, there were 4,484 people, 1,250 households, and 1,102 families residing in the city. The population density was 1,510.6 people per square mile (582.9/km2). There were 1,282 housing units at an average density of 431.9 per square mile (166.7/km2). The racial makeup of the city was 96.23% White, 0.02% African American, 0.36% Native American, 0.56% Asian, 0.65% Pacific Islander, 0.83% from other races, and 1.36% from two or more races. Hispanic or Latino of any race were 2.03% of the population.

There were 1,250 households, out of which 55.0% had children under the age of 18 living with them, 76.9% were married couples living together, 8.8% had a female householder with no husband present, and 11.8% were non-families. 9.2% of all households were made up of individuals, and 2.9% had someone living alone who was 65 years of age or older. The average household size was 3.59 and the average family size was 3.84.

In the city, the population was spread out, with 35.6% under the age of 18, 12.5% from 18 to 24, 27.3% from 25 to 44, 20.4% from 45 to 64, and 4.2% who were 65 years of age or older. The median age was 27 years. For every 100 females, there were 97.8 males. For every 100 females age 18 and over, there were 99.0 males.

The median income for a household in the city was $61,063, and the median income for a family was $61,154. Males had a median income of $41,448 versus $26,168 for females. The per capita income for the city was $19,016. About 3.2% of families and 3.3% of the population were below the poverty line, including 5.2% of those under age 18 and 4.2% of those age 65 or over.

See also
 Bountiful, Utah

References

External links

 

Cities in Davis County, Utah
Cities in Utah
Ogden–Clearfield metropolitan area
Populated places established in 1860